Hamad Al-Abdan (born 26 May 2000) is a Saudi Arabian professional footballer who plays as a midfielder for Saudi Professional League side Al-Khaleej on loan from Al-Hilal.

Career
Al-Abdan started his career at the youth team of Al-Hilal and represented the club at every level. He signed his first professional contract for the club on 25 July 2020. On 17 August 2021, Al-Abdan joined Al-Hazem on loan. On 28 August 2022, Al-Abdan joined Al-Khaleej on loan.

Career statistics

Club

Notes

Honours

Al-Hilal
Saudi Professional League: 2020–21
Kings Cup: 2019–20

References

External links
 

2000 births
Living people
Sportspeople from Riyadh
Saudi Arabian footballers
Saudi Arabia youth international footballers
Association football midfielders
Al Hilal SFC players
Al-Hazem F.C. players
Khaleej FC players
Saudi Professional League players